Rosas is a Spanish surname, derived from the Latin word rosa (rose.)   The earliest records of the name trace its appearance back to Northern Spain, in the mountains of Cantabria. It is possible that originally the Rosas family lived in or came from an area where wild roses grew.

Spelling variations of this surname include, but are not limited to: Ros, de Ros, de Rosas, Rosa, de la Rosa, Rosal, del Rosal, Rosales, Rosanes, Rozanes, de Rosales, Rosete, Rosano, Rosana, Roso, and Rozas.

Notable people with this surname include:

Juan Manuel de Rosas, nineteenth-century Argentine governor
Cesar Rosas, Mexican musician
Fernando Rosas, Portuguese academic and politician
Juventino Rosas, Mexican musician, violinist, and band leader
Aldrick Rosas, NFL placekicker

Rozas
 Ángel Rozas, Argentine governor
 Juan Martínez de Rozas, politician of the Chilean war of independence

References

External links
 House of Names - Rosas

Surnames